Cubist Still Life with Lemons (sometimes Still Life with Lemons) is a 1975 painting by Roy Lichtenstein.

Lichtenstein had a period of experimentation with still life painting from 1974 to 1976. Measuring 228.6 cm × 172.7 cm (90 in × 68 in), Still Life with Lemons represented a take on still life from the Cubist perspective, with Lichtenstein using many favorite Cubist motifs: "...pitcher, bowl of fruit, and faux wood grain - with some of his own, such as sections of the primary colors red, yellow, and blue, portions of an entablature, and a pattern of diagonal stripes." The work has an element of three-dimensionality due to its overlapping planes and reflection, although this still life series was meant to look flat.  According to Jack Cowart, "...The scale of Lichtenstein's [Cubist still life] work is antithetical to the primarily intimate and more closely related nature of real Cubism."

See also
 1975 in art

Notes

External links
Lichtenstein Foundation website

1975 paintings
Paintings by Roy Lichtenstein
Still life paintings